The third Asian Beach Games were held in Haiyang, China in 2012.

Sports

Participating nations 
43 out of 45 Asian countries participated in these games. The two countries that did not participate in the games, North Korea and Myanmar, only participated in the opening ceremony. According to the Games' official website, Kuwaiti athletes participated the Games under the Olympic flag because the Kuwait Olympic Committee was suspended due to political interference in January 2010.

Calendar

Medal table

References

Competition Schedule

External links
Olympic Council of Asia
Official Website

 
Asian Beach Games
Asian Beach Games
Asian Beach Games
Asian Games
Beach Games
Multi-sport events in China
Haiyang